The by-thirds 2015 Stevenage Borough Council election was held on 7 May 2015 to elect one third (thirteen) of the members (councillors) of the council, one for each ward, as part of the 2015 United Kingdom local elections held simultaneously with the 2015 General Election. The up for election were last contested in 2011. The Labour Party retained control of the council, which it had held continuously since 1973.

Results
In the previous result the changes were that Labour party candidates gained two Conservative-held seats and a Liberal Democrat took a Labour councillor-held seat.  As shown in the 2012 table this meant the total of councillors stood as 31, 4 and 4 for these party groups, the governing group being that of Labour councillors.  This election saw three seats in that group convert to the now largest formal opposition group of councillors, local Conservatives.

Ward by ward

Bandley Hill

Bedwell

Chells

Longmeadow

Manor

Martins Wood

Old Town

Pin Green

Roebuck

St Nicholas

Shephall

}

Symonds Green

Woodfield

References

2015 English local elections
May 2015 events in the United Kingdom
2015
2010s in Hertfordshire